Carex stipata, variously called the prickly sedge, awl-fruited sedge, awlfruit sedge, owlfruit sedge, swamp sedge, sawbeak sedge, stalk-grain sedge and common fox sedge, is a species of flowering plant in the genus Carex, native to Canada, the United States, China, Korea, Japan, and Far Eastern Russia. It is a wetland obligate.

Subtaxa
The following varieties are currently accepted:
Carex stipata var. maxima Chapm. ex Boott
Carex stipata var. stipata

References

stipata
Plants described in 1805